The Canadian International in badminton is an international open held in Canada.

As many other international championships in badminton, that usually carry the name of the main sponsor, it is designed as KLRC Atwater Canadian International.

Previous winners

Performance by nations

References

Sports competitions in Canada
Badminton tournaments in Canada
2008 establishments in Canada
Recurring sporting events established in 2008